In enzymology, a methyl-ONN-azoxymethanol beta-D-glucosyltransferase is an enzyme that catalyzes the chemical reaction

UDP-glucose + methyl-ONN-azoxymethanol  UDP + cycasin

Thus, the two substrates of this enzyme are UDP-glucose and methyl-ONN-azoxymethanol, whereas its two products are UDP and cycasin.

This enzyme belongs to the family of glycosyltransferases, specifically the hexosyltransferases.  The systematic name of this enzyme class is UDP-glucose:methyl-ONN-azoxymethanol beta-D-glucosyltransferase. Other names in common use include cycasin synthase, uridine diphosphoglucose-methylazoxymethanol glucosyltransferase, and UDP-glucose-methylazoxymethanol glucosyltransferase.

References

 

EC 2.4.1
Enzymes of unknown structure